Sielenbach is a municipality in the district of Aichach-Friedberg in Bavaria in Germany.

Partner cities
  Saint-Fraimbault-de-Prières, France, since 1992

References

Aichach-Friedberg